"One Step Closer to You" is a 1986 hit written by the then-budding songwriting/production team of Carl Sturken and Evan Rogers, along with singer/musician – and later noted soundtrack songwriter – Jeff Pescetto and former Linx frontman David Grant.  The song became the only Top 40 Pop hit for noted R&B/Hip hop singer-songwriter/producer Gavin Christopher, peaking at #22.

Background
The song first appeared (titled simply "One Step Closer") as an album track on the self-titled debut album from singer Marilyn Martin, released in early 1986. Later in 1986, Christopher released his own version of the song.

Gavin Christopher recording
Christopher's version soon cracked the top-ten on the Dance charts and the top 25 on both the Pop (#22) and R&B charts (#25). It was the biggest hit of his career.

The basic rhythm structure, bass-line, and tempo of Christopher's version bear a striking similarity to that of Michael Jackson's hit, "The Way You Make Me Feel" from his Bad album, which was released the following year.

References

1986 singles
1986 songs
Songs written by Carl Sturken and Evan Rogers
Songs written by Jeff Pescetto
Manhattan Records singles